US firearms that were captured and redesignated by the Third Reich.

Pistols
 Pistole 657(n) Ex "Kongsberg Colt" – .45 ACP
 Pistole 660(a) Ex "M1911" – .45 ACP
 Revolver 661(a) Ex "Colt M1917" – .45 ACP
 Revolver 662(a) Ex "Smith & Wesson M1917" – .45 ACP

Submachine guns
 Maschinenpistole 760/2(r) Ex "Thompson Model 1928" – .45 ACP
 Maschinenpistole 761(r) Ex "Thompson Model 1921" – .45 ACP
 Maschinenpistole 762(r) Ex "M50 Reising" – .45 ACP

Rifles
 Gewehr 249(a) Ex "M1903 Springfield" – .30-06 Springfield 
 Gewehr 250(a) Ex "M1917 Enfield" – .30-06 Springfield
 Selbstladegewehr 251(a) Ex "M1 Garand" (Semi-automatic rifle) – .30-06 Springfield
 Selbstladegewehr 455(a) Ex "M1 carbine" – .30 Carbine

See also
 List of World War II firearms of Germany

World War II infantry weapons